is a 1970 Japanese film directed by Tetsutaro Murano. Based on Jiro Asada`s novel of the same title. The film depicts how People built Mount Fuji Radar System on the top of Mount Fuji.

Cast
Yūjirō Ishihara as Gorō Umehara
 Tetsuya Watari as Youhei Kada
 Tsutomu Yamazaki as  Takeshi Ishizuka
 Ichirō Nakatani as Okada
 Shinsuke Ashida as Tatsukichi
 Makoto Sato as Morita
 Eijirō Tōno
 Kunie Tanaka
 Takeshi Katō
 Shigeru Kōyama
 Ben Hiura as A youngman
 Akira Yamauchi as Nakabayashi
 Mizuho Suzuki as Uchimura
 Shigeru Tsuyuguchi as Tomizawa
 Etsuko Ichihara as Shigeko
 Mitsuo Hamada
 Masao Shimizu as Isayama
 Yuriko Hoshi as Mitsuko
 Jukichi Uno as Muraoki
 Shintaro Katsu as Asakichi

References

External links

Nikkatsu films
1970s Japanese films